Mount Ray, also known as Ray Mountain, is a subglacial mound in Wells Gray Provincial Park, British Columbia, Canada. Mount Ray last erupted during the Pleistocene. It is part of the Wells Gray-Clearwater volcanic field.

The lava flows were restricted by larger masses of ice in the valleys on either side of Mount Ray, so the lava did not extend any great distance from its origin.

Mount Ray was named for John Bunyan Ray, the first settler in the Clearwater Valley. He was born in 1878 in North Carolina and came to the Valley in 1909. He cleared land and established a farm in the wilderness south of Clearwater Lake. He married Alice Ludtke in 1932 and they raised three children, Nancy, Doug and Bob. The Ray family decided to move to the North Thompson Valley in 1946, mainly so the children could receive a school education instead of by correspondence. In December 1947, John Ray trekked into his old homestead and died there from a heart attack. Ray Lake, east of Mount Ray, and Ray Mineral Spring are also named for John Ray.

Mount Ray is best viewed from a plane and its bright red color contrasts with the forest below. The west slopes can be seen from boats on Clearwater Lake. No trails go anywhere near the mountain. The Kostal Lake trail used to pass  to the south, but this trail was permanently closed by BC Parks in 2013.

See also
 Wells Gray-Clearwater volcanic field
 List of volcanoes in Canada
 Volcanism of Canada
 Volcanism of Western Canada
 Fissure vent

References

External links

Ray
Ray
Subglacial mounds of Canada
Pleistocene volcanoes
Monogenetic volcanoes
Cariboo Mountains
Kamloops Division Yale Land District